Abhyankar's inequality is an inequality involving extensions of valued fields in algebra, introduced by .

References

Field (mathematics)
Commutative algebra
Theorems in abstract algebra